Haaheo Seamount is a seamount near the Midway Atoll, Sovereign Seamount, Euphemia Seamount, Don Quixote Seamount, and the Northampton Seamounts.

References 

Seamounts of the Pacific Ocean